Lindsay Davenport and Mary Joe Fernandez were the defending champions but they competed with different partners that year, Davenport with Natasha Zvereva and Fernandez with Katrina Adams.

Adams and Fernandez lost in the quarterfinals to Sabine Appelmans and Miriam Oremans.

Davenport and Zvereva lost in the final 6–3, 6–1 against Gigi Fernández and Arantxa Sánchez Vicario.

Seeds
Champion seeds are indicated in bold text while text in italics indicates the round in which those seeds were eliminated.

 Gigi Fernández /  Arantxa Sánchez Vicario (champions)
 Lindsay Davenport /  Natasha Zvereva (final)
 Nicole Arendt /  Manon Bollegraf (first round)
 Katrina Adams /  Mary Joe Fernandez (quarterfinals)

Draw

References
 1997 Sydney International Women's Doubles Draw

Women's Doubles
Doubles